Rolando Moisés García Jiménez (born 15 December 1942) is a Chilean football defender who played for Chile in the 1974 FIFA World Cup. He also played for Colo-Colo.

References

External links
FIFA profile

1942 births
Living people
Chilean footballers
Chile international footballers
Association football defenders
Colo-Colo footballers
1974 FIFA World Cup players
Ñublense managers
Huachipato managers
Cobresal managers